The Essential Collection (1975–1982) is a compilation album by the American band Poco, released in 1997.

Track listing
"Keep On Tryin’" (Timothy B. Schmit) – 2:54
"Makin’ Love" (Rusty Young) – 2:55
"Lovin’ Arms" (Young) – 3:29
"Flyin’ Solo" (Timothy B. Schmit, Jacob Otis Brennan) – 3:36
"Rose Of Cimarron" (Young) – 6:42
"Too Many Nights Too Long" (Paul Cotton) – 5:59
"Tulsa Turnaround" (Cotton) – 2:40
"Stealaway" (Young) – 3:12
"Indian Summer" (Cotton) – 4:40
"Living In The Band" (Cotton) – 3:14
"Me And You" (Schmit) – 2:44
"Heart Of The Night" (Cotton) – 4:49
"Crazy Love" (Young) – 2:55
"Legend" (Young) – 4:16
"Midnight Rain" (Cotton) – 4:25
"Under The Gun" (Cotton) – 3:11
"Widowmaker" (Young) – 4:25
"Sometimes (We Are All We Got)" (Cotton) – 3:35
"The Price Of Love" (Don & Phil Everly) – 3:23
"Ashes" (Young, Johnny Logan) – 2:59
"Feudin’" (Young) – 2:20

Personnel
Rusty Young – steel guitar, banjo, dobro, guitar, piano
George Grantham - drums, vocals
Timothy B. Schmit – bass, vocals
Paul Cotton – guitar, vocals
Charlie Harrison – bass, vocals
Steve Chapman – drums
Kim Bullard – keyboards, vocals

References

Poco compilation albums
1997 compilation albums
MCA Records compilation albums